Ilkeston Community Hospital is a healthcare facility at Heanor Road, Ilkeston in Derbyshire, England.

History
The facility has its origins in a cottage hospital established in Station Road in August 1884. The hospital moved to a new purpose-built facility which was opened at 99-109 Heanor Road by Lord Belper in March 1894. The hospital joined the National Health Service in 1948 and, after it became dilapidated, a new facility was built further north on the Heanor Road in 1987: the new facility was opened by Diana, Princess of Wales in December 1987.

References

External links
Official site

Hospital buildings completed in 1987
Hospitals in Derbyshire
Hospitals established in 1987
1987 establishments in England
Ilkeston
NHS hospitals in England